Sakharam Binder (Sakharam, the Binder) is a play by Indian playwright Vijay Tendulkar written in Marathi and first performed in 1972. It was banned in India in 1974. It was produced and directed by Kamlakar Sarang.

Synopsis
Sakharam Binder, the protagonist, thinks he has the system by the tail and he can disregard the culture & societal values as long as he is truthful. That system is the de facto enslavement of women in postcolonial India, despite the promises of democracy and modernity. Sakharam, a bookbinder, picks up other men's discarded women—castoff wives who would otherwise be homeless, destitute or murdered with impunity, and takes them in as domestic servants and sex partners.

He rules his home like a tin-pot tyrant, yet each woman is told that she is free to leave whenever she likes. He will even give her a sari, 50 rupees and a ticket to wherever she wants to go. Everything good and proper, where Sakharam Binder is concerned, he says. He's no husband to forget common decency. What he does not anticipate are the moral and emotional complications of this arrangement, which prove heartbreakingly ruinous to everyone involved.

Over the decades, the role of Sakharam has been performed by many actors including Nilu Phule, Sayaji Shinde, Rajiv Nema, Sanjiva Sahai and Jitendra Ghete.

Adaptation and Translations
The play has since been adapted and translated into many Indian languages, including Kannada, Hindi, Bengali and English.

It was additionally included as the closing play at the month-long, Tendulkar Festival, held in  New York city, in 2004.

It has been adapted into two Indian films by the same name in Marathi by Arun Hornekar in 1974, and by Sandesh Kulkarni in 2004.

Further reading
 Five Plays, Vijay Tendulkar. (Various Translators), Bombay, Oxford University Press, 1992. .
 Collected Plays in Translation: Kamala, Silence! the Court Is in Session, Sakharam Binder, the Vultures, Encounter in Umbugland, Ghashiram Kotwal, a Friend's Story, Kanyadaan. New Delhi, 2003, Oxford University Press. .
 The Archetypal Identity of Laxmi in Sakharam Binder, Mohan R. Limaye, Modern Asian Studies, Vol. 12, No. 1 (1978), pp. 135-143
 Champa and Laxmi in Sakharam Binder
 Binderche Diwas, by Kamlakar Sarang,

References

External links
 'Sakharam Binder', Review, Variety, Nov. 9, 2004
 Detailed Story of 'Sakharam Binder'

Postmodern plays
Plays by Vijay Tendulkar
1972 plays
Marathi-language plays
Indian plays adapted into films